The 1962–63 Toronto Maple Leafs season saw the team finish first in the National Hockey League (NHL) with a record of 35 wins, 23 losses, and 12 ties for 82 points. It was the first time they had finished first overall in the league since 1948. In the playoffs, they defeated their arch-rivals, the Montreal Canadiens, four games to one, in the Semi-finals. They then defeated the Detroit Red Wings in five games to win their second straight Stanley Cup.

Offseason

Regular season

Season standings

Record vs. opponents

Schedule and results

|- align="center" bgcolor="#CCFFCC"
|1||W||October 10, 1962||3–1 || align="left"| @ Chicago Black Hawks (1962–63) ||1–0–0||2|| || || || || W1
|- align="center"
|2||T||October 13, 1962||2–2 || align="left"|  Boston Bruins (1962–63) ||1–0–1||3|| || || || || T1
|- align="center" bgcolor="#FFBBBB"
|3||L||October 14, 1962||3–5 || align="left"| @ New York Rangers (1962–63) ||1–1–1||3|| || || || || L1
|- align="center" bgcolor="#FFBBBB"
|4||L||October 18, 1962||2–4 || align="left"| @ Montreal Canadiens (1962–63) ||1–2–1||3|| || || || || L2
|- align="center" bgcolor="#CCFFCC"
|5||W||October 20, 1962||3–1 || align="left"|  Chicago Black Hawks (1962–63) ||2–2–1||5|| || || || || W1
|- align="center" bgcolor="#CCFFCC"
|6||W||October 21, 1962||6–4 || align="left"| @ Boston Bruins (1962–63) ||3–2–1||7|| || || || || W2
|- align="center" bgcolor="#FFBBBB"
|7||L||October 27, 1962||1–5 || align="left"|  New York Rangers (1962–63) ||3–3–1||7|| || || || || L1
|- align="center" bgcolor="#FFBBBB"
|8||L||October 28, 1962||0–2 || align="left"| @ Detroit Red Wings (1962–63) ||3–4–1||7|| || || || || L2
|- align="center" bgcolor="#FFBBBB"
|9||L||October 31, 1962||3–4 || align="left"|  Montreal Canadiens (1962–63) ||3–5–1||7|| || || || || L3
|-

|- align="center" bgcolor="#CCFFCC"
|10||W||November 1, 1962||3–1 || align="left"| @ Montreal Canadiens (1962–63) ||4–5–1||9|| || || || || W1
|- align="center" bgcolor="#FFBBBB"
|11||L||November 3, 1962||3–7 || align="left"|  Detroit Red Wings (1962–63) ||4–6–1||9|| || || || || L1
|- align="center" bgcolor="#CCFFCC"
|12||W||November 7, 1962||5–1 || align="left"| @ New York Rangers (1962–63) ||5–6–1||11|| || || || || W1
|- align="center" bgcolor="#CCFFCC"
|13||W||November 10, 1962||5–3 || align="left"|  New York Rangers (1962–63) ||6–6–1||13|| || || || || W2
|- align="center" bgcolor="#CCFFCC"
|14||W||November 11, 1962||5–3 || align="left"| @ Chicago Black Hawks (1962–63) ||7–6–1||15|| || || || || W3
|- align="center" bgcolor="#CCFFCC"
|15||W||November 14, 1962||4–2 || align="left"|  Montreal Canadiens (1962–63) ||8–6–1||17|| || || || || W4
|- align="center" bgcolor="#CCFFCC"
|16||W||November 17, 1962||3–2 || align="left"|  Detroit Red Wings (1962–63) ||9–6–1||19|| || || || || W5
|- align="center" bgcolor="#FFBBBB"
|17||L||November 18, 1962||1–3 || align="left"| @ New York Rangers (1962–63) ||9–7–1||19|| || || || || L1
|- align="center" bgcolor="#FFBBBB"
|18||L||November 22, 1962||0–1 || align="left"| @ Chicago Black Hawks (1962–63) ||9–8–1||19|| || || || || L2
|- align="center" bgcolor="#CCFFCC"
|19||W||November 24, 1962||4–1 || align="left"|  New York Rangers (1962–63) ||10–8–1||21|| || || || || W1
|- align="center" bgcolor="#FFBBBB"
|20||L||November 25, 1962||2–5 || align="left"| @ Boston Bruins (1962–63) ||10–9–1||21|| || || || || L1
|- align="center"
|21||T||November 29, 1962||4–4 || align="left"| @ Montreal Canadiens (1962–63) ||10–9–2||22|| || || || || T1
|-

|- align="center" bgcolor="#CCFFCC"
|22||W||December 1, 1962||8–2 || align="left"|  Boston Bruins (1962–63) ||11–9–2||24|| || || || || W1
|- align="center" bgcolor="#CCFFCC"
|23||W||December 2, 1962||3–1 || align="left"| @ Detroit Red Wings (1962–63) ||12–9–2||26|| || || || || W2
|- align="center" bgcolor="#CCFFCC"
|24||W||December 5, 1962||2–1 || align="left"|  Montreal Canadiens (1962–63) ||13–9–2||28|| || || || || W3
|- align="center"
|25||T||December 8, 1962||1–1 || align="left"|  Chicago Black Hawks (1962–63) ||13–9–3||29|| || || || || T1
|- align="center" bgcolor="#FFBBBB"
|26||L||December 9, 1962||3–4 || align="left"| @ Detroit Red Wings (1962–63) ||13–10–3||29|| || || || || L1
|- align="center" bgcolor="#CCFFCC"
|27||W||December 15, 1962||8–2 || align="left"|  Boston Bruins (1962–63) ||14–10–3||31|| || || || || W1
|- align="center" bgcolor="#CCFFCC"
|28||W||December 16, 1962||6–2 || align="left"| @ Chicago Black Hawks (1962–63) ||15–10–3||33|| || || || || W2
|- align="center"
|29||T||December 20, 1962||4–4 || align="left"| @ Montreal Canadiens (1962–63) ||15–10–4||34|| || || || || T1
|- align="center" bgcolor="#CCFFCC"
|30||W||December 22, 1962||4–2 || align="left"|  New York Rangers (1962–63) ||16–10–4||36|| || || || || W1
|- align="center" bgcolor="#CCFFCC"
|31||W||December 23, 1962||5–4 || align="left"| @ Boston Bruins (1962–63) ||17–10–4||38|| || || || || W2
|- align="center" bgcolor="#FFBBBB"
|32||L||December 25, 1962||1–2 || align="left"| @ Detroit Red Wings (1962–63) ||17–11–4||38|| || || || || L1
|- align="center" bgcolor="#CCFFCC"
|33||W||December 26, 1962||5–4 || align="left"|  Detroit Red Wings (1962–63) ||18–11–4||40|| || || || || W1
|- align="center"
|34||T||December 29, 1962||1–1 || align="left"|  Chicago Black Hawks (1962–63) ||18–11–5||41|| || || || || T1
|-

|- align="center" bgcolor="#FFBBBB"
|35||L||January 1, 1963||0–3 || align="left"| @ Boston Bruins (1962–63) ||18–12–5||41|| || || || || L1
|- align="center" bgcolor="#FFBBBB"
|36||L||January 2, 1963||2–3 || align="left"| @ New York Rangers (1962–63) ||18–13–5||41|| || || || || L2
|- align="center" bgcolor="#CCFFCC"
|37||W||January 5, 1963||4–2 || align="left"|  Boston Bruins (1962–63) ||19–13–5||43|| || || || || W1
|- align="center" bgcolor="#CCFFCC"
|38||W||January 6, 1963||5–1 || align="left"| @ Chicago Black Hawks (1962–63) ||20–13–5||45|| || || || || W2
|- align="center" bgcolor="#FFBBBB"
|39||L||January 9, 1963||1–3 || align="left"|  Chicago Black Hawks (1962–63) ||20–14–5||45|| || || || || L1
|- align="center" bgcolor="#CCFFCC"
|40||W||January 12, 1963||2–1 || align="left"|  Detroit Red Wings (1962–63) ||21–14–5||47|| || || || || W1
|- align="center"
|41||T||January 13, 1963||2–2 || align="left"| @ Boston Bruins (1962–63) ||21–14–6||48|| || || || || T1
|- align="center" bgcolor="#FFBBBB"
|42||L||January 17, 1963||4–6 || align="left"| @ Montreal Canadiens (1962–63) ||21–15–6||48|| || || || || L1
|- align="center" bgcolor="#FFBBBB"
|43||L||January 19, 1963||1–4 || align="left"|  Chicago Black Hawks (1962–63) ||21–16–6||48|| || || || || L2
|- align="center"
|44||T||January 20, 1963||2–2 || align="left"| @ Detroit Red Wings (1962–63) ||21–16–7||49|| || || || || T1
|- align="center" bgcolor="#CCFFCC"
|45||W||January 23, 1963||5–1 || align="left"|  Montreal Canadiens (1962–63) ||22–16–7||51|| || || || || W1
|- align="center" bgcolor="#CCFFCC"
|46||W||January 24, 1963||6–3 || align="left"| @ Boston Bruins (1962–63) ||23–16–7||53|| || || || || W2
|- align="center" bgcolor="#FFBBBB"
|47||L||January 26, 1963||2–5 || align="left"|  Boston Bruins (1962–63) ||23–17–7||53|| || || || || L1
|- align="center" bgcolor="#CCFFCC"
|48||W||January 27, 1963||4–2 || align="left"| @ New York Rangers (1962–63) ||24–17–7||55|| || || || || W1
|- align="center" bgcolor="#CCFFCC"
|49||W||January 31, 1963||6–3 || align="left"| @ Montreal Canadiens (1962–63) ||25–17–7||57|| || || || || W2
|-

|- align="center"
|50||T||February 2, 1963||2–2 || align="left"|  New York Rangers (1962–63) ||25–17–8||58|| || || || || T1
|- align="center" bgcolor="#FFBBBB"
|51||L||February 3, 1963||1–3 || align="left"| @ Chicago Black Hawks (1962–63) ||25–18–8||58|| || || || || L1
|- align="center"
|52||T||February 9, 1963||3–3 || align="left"|  Montreal Canadiens (1962–63) ||25–18–9||59|| || || || || T1
|- align="center" bgcolor="#FFBBBB"
|53||L||February 10, 1963||1–2 || align="left"| @ Detroit Red Wings (1962–63) ||25–19–9||59|| || || || || L1
|- align="center" bgcolor="#CCFFCC"
|54||W||February 13, 1963||6–2 || align="left"|  Detroit Red Wings (1962–63) ||26–19–9||61|| || || || || W1
|- align="center" bgcolor="#CCFFCC"
|55||W||February 16, 1963||4–2 || align="left"|  New York Rangers (1962–63) ||27–19–9||63|| || || || || W2
|- align="center" bgcolor="#FFBBBB"
|56||L||February 17, 1963||1–4 || align="left"| @ New York Rangers (1962–63) ||27–20–9||63|| || || || || L1
|- align="center" bgcolor="#CCFFCC"
|57||W||February 20, 1963||2–1 || align="left"|  Montreal Canadiens (1962–63) ||28–20–9||65|| || || || || W1
|- align="center" bgcolor="#FFBBBB"
|58||L||February 23, 1963||2–4 || align="left"|  Boston Bruins (1962–63) ||28–21–9||65|| || || || || L1
|- align="center" bgcolor="#CCFFCC"
|59||W||February 27, 1963||6–3 || align="left"|  Chicago Black Hawks (1962–63) ||29–21–9||67|| || || || || W1
|-

|- align="center" bgcolor="#CCFFCC"
|60||W||March 2, 1963||4–3 || align="left"|  New York Rangers (1962–63) ||30–21–9||69|| || || || || W2
|- align="center" bgcolor="#CCFFCC"
|61||W||March 3, 1963||6–3 || align="left"| @ Boston Bruins (1962–63) ||31–21–9||71|| || || || || W3
|- align="center" bgcolor="#CCFFCC"
|62||W||March 6, 1963||4–0 || align="left"|  Boston Bruins (1962–63) ||32–21–9||73|| || || || || W4
|- align="center" bgcolor="#CCFFCC"
|63||W||March 9, 1963||5–3 || align="left"|  Detroit Red Wings (1962–63) ||33–21–9||75|| || || || || W5
|- align="center"
|64||T||March 10, 1963||1–1 || align="left"| @ Chicago Black Hawks (1962–63) ||33–21–10||76|| || || || || T1
|- align="center"
|65||T||March 14, 1963||3–3 || align="left"| @ Montreal Canadiens (1962–63) ||33–21–11||77|| || || || || T2
|- align="center" bgcolor="#CCFFCC"
|66||W||March 16, 1963||3–0 || align="left"|  Chicago Black Hawks (1962–63) ||34–21–11||79|| || || || || W1
|- align="center" bgcolor="#CCFFCC"
|67||W||March 17, 1963||2–1 || align="left"| @ New York Rangers (1962–63) ||35–21–11||81|| || || || || W2
|- align="center"
|68||T||March 20, 1963||3–3 || align="left"|  Montreal Canadiens (1962–63) ||35–21–12||82|| || || || || T1
|- align="center" bgcolor="#FFBBBB"
|69||L||March 23, 1963||1–2 || align="left"|  Detroit Red Wings (1962–63) ||35–22–12||82|| || || || || L1
|- align="center" bgcolor="#FFBBBB"
|70||L||March 24, 1963||2–3 || align="left"| @ Detroit Red Wings (1962–63) ||35–23–12||82|| || || || || L2
|-

All times EASTERN

Player statistics

Forwards

Note: GP = Games played; G = Goals; A = Assists; Pts = Points; PIM = Penalty Minutes

Defencemen

Note: GP = Games played; G = Goals; A = Assists; Pts = Points; +/- = Plus/Minus; PIM = Penalty Minutes

Goaltending
Note: GP= Games played; W= Wins; L= Losses; T = Ties; SO = Shutouts; GAA = Goals Against

Playoffs

Stanley Cup Finals
Johnny Bower limited the Wings to 10 goals in the five games, and five different Leafs had multiple-goal games: Duff, Nevin, Stewart, Kelly and Keon.

|- align="center" bgcolor="#CCFFCC"
|1||W||March 26, 1963||3–1 || || align="left"| Montreal Canadiens (1962–63) || 1–0|| || || || W1
|- align="center" bgcolor="#CCFFCC"
|2||W||March 28, 1963||3–2 || || align="left"| Montreal Canadiens (1962–63) || 2–0|| || || || W2
|- align="center" bgcolor="#CCFFCC"
|3||W||March 30, 1963||2–0 || || align="left"| @ Montreal Canadiens (1962–63) || 3–0|| || || || W3
|- align="center" bgcolor="#FFBBBB"
|4||L||April 2, 1963||1–3 || || align="left"| @ Montreal Canadiens (1962–63) || 3–1|| || || || L1
|- align="center" bgcolor="#CCFFCC"
|5||W||April 4, 1963||5–0 || || align="left"| Montreal Canadiens (1962–63) || 4–1|| || || || W1
|-

|- align="center" bgcolor="#CCFFCC"
|1||W||April 9, 1963||4–2 || || align="left"| Detroit Red Wings (1962–63) || 1–0|| || || || W1
|- align="center" bgcolor="#CCFFCC"
|2||W||April 11, 1963||4–2 || || align="left"| Detroit Red Wings (1962–63) || 2–0|| || || || W2
|- align="center" bgcolor="#FFBBBB"
|3||L||April 14, 1963||2–3 || || align="left"| @ Detroit Red Wings (1962–63) || 2–1|| || || || L1
|- align="center" bgcolor="#CCFFCC"
|4||W||April 16, 1963||4–2 || || align="left"| @ Detroit Red Wings (1962–63) || 3–1|| || || || W1
|- align="center" bgcolor="#CCFFCC"
|5||W||April 18, 1963||3–1 || || align="left"| Detroit Red Wings (1962–63) || 4–1|| || || || W2
|-

Awards and records
 Carl Brewer, Runner-Up, Norris Trophy
 Kent Douglas, Calder Memorial Trophy
 Dave Keon, Lady Byng Trophy

References
 Maple Leafs on Hockey Database
 Maple Leafs on Database Hockey

Stanley Cup championship seasons
Toronto Maple Leafs seasons
Toronto Maple Leafs season, 1962-63
Tor